Marie-Jeanne Meyer (born 1942) is a French billionaire and member of the Louis Dreyfus family.

Early life 
Born Marie-Jeanne Louis-Dreyfus, she was one of three children born to Jean and Jeanne Madeline (née Depierre) Louis-Dreyfus. Her brother is Robert Louis-Dreyfus and her sister is Monique Roosmale Nepveu. Her father was Jewish and her mother Roman Catholic. She is the great granddaughter of Léopold Louis-Dreyfus, founder of the Louis-Dreyfus Group, which had begun buying and selling wheat in the Alsace region a century earlier, and rapidly diversified into shipping, oil and other commodities. Her grandfather was Louis Louis-Dreyfus who served in the French Parliament during the French Third Republic. After the death of her brother Robert, his widow and second wife Margarita Louis-Dreyfus (b: Rita Bogdanova), inherited 60% of the Louis Dreyfus Group (later increased to 65% in 2012). As of 2013, Marie-Jeanne owned 12.5% of the Louis Dreyfus Group making her a billionaire. In 2009, she founded the venture capital company Florac SAS.

As of March 2015, she had a net worth of US$1.5 billion.

Personal life
She is married to Philippe Meyer. They have three children.

Actress Julia Louis-Dreyfus is her cousin.

References

1942 births
French billionaires
French people of Jewish descent
Louis-Dreyfus family
Living people